Georges Arnould Maton (26 October 1913 – 6 July 1998) was a French cyclist. He won a bronze medal in Men's Tandem at the 1936 Summer Olympics.

References

1913 births
1998 deaths
French male cyclists
Olympic bronze medalists for France
Cyclists at the 1936 Summer Olympics
Olympic cyclists of France
Olympic medalists in cycling
Sportspeople from Lille
Medalists at the 1936 Summer Olympics
Cyclists from Hauts-de-France